Benorilate (INN), or benorylate, is an ester-linked codrug of aspirin with paracetamol. It is used as an anti-inflammatory and antipyretic medication. In the treatment of childhood fever, it has been shown to be inferior to paracetamol and aspirin taken separately. In addition, because it is converted to aspirin, benorylate is not recommended in children due to concerns about Reye syndrome.

Synthesis

Acetyl salicoyl chloride [5538-51-2] (1) is reacted with paracetamol (2) to give benorilate (3).

Saponification of the ester led to Acetaminosalol (Phenetsal) [118-57-0].

References 

Analgesics
Antipyretics
Codrugs